An abdominal mass is any localized enlargement or swelling in the human abdomen. Depending on its location, the abdominal mass may be caused by an enlarged liver (hepatomegaly), enlarged spleen (splenomegaly), protruding kidney, a pancreatic mass, a retroperitoneal mass (a mass in the posterior of the peritoneum), an abdominal aortic aneurysm, or various tumours, such as those caused by abdominal carcinomatosis and omental metastasis. The treatments depend on the cause, and may range from watchful waiting to radical surgery.

Presentation
Many abdominal masses are discovered incidentally during routine physical examination. When they are present symptomatically, abdominal masses are most frequently associated with pain or digestive problems. However, depending on the cause, masses may be associated with other signs and symptoms, such as jaundice or bowel obstruction.

Causes
 Abdominal aortic aneurysm
 Bladder distention
 Cholecystitis (an inflammation of the gallbladder)
 Colon cancer
 Crohn's disease
 Bowel obstruction
 Diverticulitis
 Gallbladder tumor
 Hydronephrosis (fluid-filled kidney)
 Kidney cancer (including renal cell carcinoma)
 Liver cancer
 Hepatomegaly (Liver enlargement)
 Neuroblastoma
 Ovarian cyst
 Pancreatic abscess
 Pancreatic pseudocyst
 Splenomegaly (Spleen enlargement)
 Stomach cancer
 Uterine leiomyoma (fibroids)
 Volvulus (twisted piece of the gastrointestinal tract)
 Uretero-pelvic junction obstruction

Diagnosis
The first steps in diagnosis are a medical history and physical examination. Important clues during history include weight loss, diarrhea and abdominal pain.

During physical examination, the clinician must identify the location of the mass, as well as characterize its location (usually specified in terms of quadrants). The mass should be assessed for whether it is rigid or mobile. It should also be characterized for pulse or peristalsis, as these would help in further identifying the mass.

Routine blood tests are usually the next step in diagnosis after a thorough medical history and physical examination. They should include a full blood count, blood urea nitrogen (BUN), creatinine, and liver function tests such as albumin, international normalized ratio (INR), partial thromboplastin time (PTT), serum amylase and total bilirubin (TBIL). If late-stage liver disease is suspected, then a serum glucose may be appropriate.

References
 MedlinePlus medical encyclopedia: Abdominal mass – An informative primer on abdominal masses and their common causes.
 First Principles of Gastroenterology: Abdominal Mass – This chapter discusses the basic approach to abdominal masses.

External links 

Medical signs